Oblations and Blessings is an album by jazz saxophonist David S. Ware, recorded in 1995 and released on the Silkheart label. It features the David S. Ware Quartet with pianist Matthew Shipp, bassist William Parker and drummer Whit Dickey playing all original Ware compositions.

Reception

In his review for AllMusic, Don Snowden states "No one who hears Oblations and Blessings could ever doubt the generosity of Ware's offering here. The man must have been absolutely, utterly drained—emotionally, physically and spiritually—after this session."

Track listing
All compositions by David S. Ware
 "Oblations and Blessings" – 17:05
 "Riff Unknown" – 10:53 
 "Of Shambhala" – 11:05 
 "Fire Within" – 11:07 
 "Manu's Ideal" – 10:13
 "Serpents and Visions" – 8:37

Personnel
David S. Ware – tenor sax
Matthew Shipp – piano
William Parker – bass
Whit Dickey – drums

References

1996 albums
David S. Ware albums
Silkheart Records albums